In from the Side is a British film, directed by Matt Carter and written by Carter and Adam Silver.  Carter had been involved in inclusive rugby for 8 years when the film was released.

It was released in the United Kingdom on 16 September 2022. It is due to be released in the USA on 20 January 2023. In the UK it is rated 15.

Synopsis

Mark (Alexander Lincoln) is a new and relatively inexperienced rugby player on the B team at a London gay rugby club and has a drunken encounter with Warren (Alexander King) who is a star player on the A team. Both men have long-term partners. They continue to have an affair and try to keep this from their partners and teammates.  When this comes into the open it ultimately puts the future of the rugby club at risk.

Cast
Alexander Lincoln as Mark
Alexander King as Warren
William Hearle as Henry
Christopher Sherwood as Jimmy
Carl Loughlin as Gareth
Peter McPherson as John
Pearse Egan as Pinky
Ivan Comisso as Carlos
Alex Hammond as Richard
Chris Garner as Stuart
Mary Lincoln as Alice
Nigel Fairs as Len
Frank Assi as Neil
Tom Murphy as Barry
Kane Surry as Olli
Steve Brockman as Cardiff Draconians Team Captain

Background and release
In from the Side was partly funded using a crowdfunding model.

The film was shown at the BFI Flare Festival in 2022. It was noted that it is unusual for an LGBT film in that coming out or homophobia are not in the film at all.

It was part of the official selection of the Dayton LGBT film festival in 2022. It was selected for Outfilm Poznań festival. The film will also be shown at Hong Kong Lesbian & Gay Film Festival in 2022 and Inside Out Toronto LGBT Film Festival.

Reviews 
Pip Ellwood-Hughes in Entertainment Focus described it as  "'In From The Side' offers a glimpse into the life of a group of friends who play rugby together and happen to be gay. It's different from pretty much every other film I've seen in recent years that falls under the LGBTQ+ umbrella, and it's not a surprise that the film is being embraced by the mainstream. With well-written characters, a truly engaging story and strong performances, 'In From The Side' is without a doubt the best gay film that's been released in a while, and it's also one of the best films I've seen all year."

Cath Clarke of The Guardian gave the film 3 out of 5 stars describing "The setting of the London team is terrifically done, but the dull romance at the centre of Matt Carter's film long outstays its welcome." Xan Brooks also of The Guardian criticised it as a "plodding script".

Awards
Nominated for Outstanding First Feature at the Frameline Film Festival 2022.

Winner for Best First Narrative Feature and Best Actor at FilmOut San Diego Film Festival 2022 

Winner for Best Narrative Feature Audience Award at Out On Film Film Festival Atlanta 2022 

Winner for Best Narrative Feature at ReelQ Pittsburgh Film Festival 2022 

Runner-up for Best Feature Film at OutShine Film Festival Fort Lauderdale 2022

References

External links
 
 

2022 films
British LGBT-related films
2022 LGBT-related films